BTL Institute of Technology (BTLIT) was an engineering college situated in Bommasandra Industrial Area near Electronics City in Bengaluru, India.  The college was founded in 1997, initially being affiliated to the Bangalore University, Bengaluru. From 1998, the college has been associated with Visvesvaraya Technological University, Belagavi.

Founder

Late B.T Lakshman an NRI is the founder of the institution. He earlier worked as a civil engineer in Delaware, United States.

Courses

Undergraduate (B.Tech)

 Computer Science
 Information Science
 Electronics and Communication
 Mechanical Engineering
 Electrical and Electronics

Postgraduate (M.Tech)

 Computer Science
 Information Science
 Electronics and Communication

Closure

BTLIT was closed permanently in 2021 due to lack of admissions and poor management of the institution that was a result of dispute between partners of the late founders.

References

External links 
From educationinfoindia

All India Council for Technical Education
Affiliates of Visvesvaraya Technological University
Engineering colleges in Bangalore